Weiss Amphitheater is an amphitheater-like caldera, 2 nautical miles (3.7 km) wide and breached at the southern side, occupying the south-central part of Mount Sidley, in the Executive Committee Range, Marie Byrd Land. It was mapped by the United States Geological Survey (USGS) from surveys and U.S. Navy trimetrogon photography, 1958–60. It was named by the Advisory Committee on Antarctic Names (US-ACAN) for Bernard D. Weiss, Meteorologist-in-Charge at Byrd Station, 1959.

Volcanoes of Marie Byrd Land
Executive Committee Range
Calderas of Antarctica